The bullhead triplefin (Trianectes bucephalus) is a fish of the family Tripterygiidae and only member of the genus Trianectes

Description 
Its length is up to about 7 cm.

This nocturnal species is infrequently observed, during the day it often shelters beneath small rocks.

Ecosystem 
The bullhead triplefin is found in the eastern Indian Ocean around southern Australia, from Western Australia to Victoria and Tasmania at depths down to 5 m.  The animal inhabits intertidal areas.

References
 

Tripterygiidae
Marine fish of Southern Australia
bullhead triplefin